The Northern Link is a proposed rapid transit line of the MTR system of Hong Kong which would connect the Tuen Ma line and the Lok Ma Chau Spur Line of the East Rail line. The link would also serve as a connection to the border checkpoint to mainland China for passengers to and from the western New Territories. The Northern Link would start at Kam Sheung Road and end at Lok Ma Chau and Kwu Tung, and would be constructed either as a direct shuttle or with intermediate stations.

Other benefits for constructing this project are that it would significantly cut journey times for certain trips (for example from Yuen Long to Fanling) 2020: approx. 20 stations When it is completed: approx. 5 stations and significantly reduce costs for these trips, and also relieve the large number of passengers using the East Rail line by diverting some passengers to the West Rail line (now known as the Tuen Ma line).

According to the Railway Development Strategy 2014, a shuttle service between Kam Sheung Road station and Kwu Tung station spanning  is expected to begin construction in 2018 and be inaugurated in 2023.

Phases 
The Northern Link (NOL) project is expected to consist of two phases.

Phase 1

Phase 1 consists of the construction and completion of Kwu Tung station that will initially serve the East Rail line after its opening, then later the Northern Link after the completion of Phase 2. It had been partially built by KCR Corporation during the construction of the Lok Ma Chau Spur Line. Construction of Kwu Tung station was approved by the government in 2022 is scheduled to commence in 2023 with completion due in 2027.

Phase 2
Phase 2 consists of the building of the Northern Link main line tracks from Kam Sheung Road station to Kwu Tung station. It also includes the construction of 3 new stations (Au Tau, Ngau Tam Mei and San Tin) along with the expansion of Kam Sheung Road station to accommodate the new tracks and platforms.  Planning and designing began in 2021. Construction of the mainline is planned to begin in 2025 and be completed in 2034.

Land hoarding 
In July 2021, Liber Research Community found that developers had begun to hoard land alongside the Northern Link line, buying at least 80 hectares of land near the line.

Stations

References

External Links
 MTR Northern Link Project Website

MTR lines
Standard gauge railways in Hong Kong
Proposed railway lines in Hong Kong